Villers-sous-Montrond (literally Villers on Montrond) is a former commune in the Doubs department in the Bourgogne-Franche-Comté region in eastern France. On 1 January 2022, it was merged into the new commune of Les Monts-Ronds.

Population

See also 
 Montrond-le-Château
Communes of the Doubs department

References

Former communes of Doubs